Poopsie may refer to:

Poopsie, also Poopsie & Co or Oopsie Poopsie, alternative titles for Sex Pot (1975 film)
Poopsie (1973–2011), the oldest spectacled bear recorded in captivity, at Salisbury Zoo
Poopsie Slime Surprise, a children's toy line produced by MGA Entertainment
Poopsie, a character in the musical The Pajama Game